Ibrahim Garba is a Nigerian geologist and university administrator. He is the former Vice Chancellor of Ahmadu Bello University, Zaria he was succeeded by Kabir Bala. He had also served as the Vice Chancellor of the Kano State University of Science and Technology, Wudil. Garba hails from Riruwai in Kano State.

Career
Garba worked on secondment at the Federal Ministry of Mines and Steel Development, Abuja as Director-General, Nigeria Mining Cadastre Office. He spear-headed the development and implementation of the Mining Cadastre System in Nigeria.

References

Vice-Chancellors of Nigerian universities
Living people
Place of birth missing (living people)
Academic staff of Ahmadu Bello University
Nigerian geologists
1957 births
Ahmadu Bello University alumni
Academic staff of Kano State University of Technology